Sifet Podžić (born 1 May 1959) is a Bosnian politician and former Army commander who served as Minister of Defence from 2019 to 2023. He has been a member of the Democratic Front since 2013.

Podžić is a former member of the national House of Peoples and the first Chief of Joint Staff of the Armed Forces of Bosnia and Herzegovina. He has also served as the Bosnia and Herzegovina Ambassador to Bulgaria.

Early life and education
Podžić was born in Žepa, present-day Bosnia and Herzegovina, on 1 May 1959. He holds a degree in diplomacy from the Faculty of Political Science at the University of Sarajevo.

Minister of Defence (2019–2023)

Appointment

On 23 December 2019, Podžić was appointed by the Democratic Front as Minister of Defence in the government of Zoran Tegeltija.

Tenure
On 14 July 2021, Podžić and the Bosnian Foreign Minister Bisera Turković met with NATO Secretary General Jens Stoltenberg in Brussels.

In August 2021, Bosnian Presidency members Željko Komšić and Šefik Džaferović, without including third member Milorad Dodik, instructed the Ministry of Security to be available for putting out the wildfires in Herzegovina which had formed a few days before. This came after Dodik refused to give consent on the Bosnian Armed Forces to use its military helicopters to help in putting out the fires, because the consent of all three members of the Presidency is required for the military force's helicopters to be used. On 19 August, Dodik justified himself saying that the "Helicopters are 40–50 years old. The people flying them have courage. Of course, that is not the only reason why I did not participate in the Presidency sessions. That reason is well known and it will remain so." However, on 23 August, Podžić reacted to Dodik's statement, saying "The helicopters are perfectly fine, the only reason they didn't help in putting out the fires is Dodik."

In October 2021, Podžić canceled a military exercise between the Serbian Army and the Armed Forces of Bosnia and Herzegovina due to the "bad COVID-19 epidemiological situation in the country and because of the small number of vaccinated members of the Armed Forces." This was met with outrage by Chairman of the Council of Ministers Zoran Tegeltija, who sent a request for the removal of Podžić as minister to the national Parliament. Some days later, he submitted the decision on the dismissal of Podžić to the House of Representatives. On 26 October, the majority of the House of Representatives members voted against Tegeltija's decision and did not support Podžić's dismissal. 

Podžić was succeeded as Minister of Defence by Zukan Helez on 25 January 2023, following the formation of a new government presided over by Borjana Krišto.

Personal life
Podžić is married and has two children. Besides his native Bosnian, he speaks English and Slovene fluently.

Health
On 17 October 2022, Podžić was rushed to hospital and had emergency surgery to remove a blood clot in his abdominal aorta. He was placed into the intensive care unit the next day. Podžić recovered and was discharged from hospital on 21 October.

References

External links
Minister of Defence profile

1959 births
Living people
Academic staff of the University of Sarajevo
Military of Bosnia and Herzegovina
Ambassadors of Bosnia and Herzegovina to Bulgaria
Members of the House of Peoples of Bosnia and Herzegovina
Government ministers of Bosnia and Herzegovina
Defence ministers of Bosnia and Herzegovina